"Someday My Prince Will Come"  is a song from Walt Disney's 1937 animated movie Snow White and the Seven Dwarfs. It was written by Larry Morey (lyrics) & Frank Churchill (music), and performed by Adriana Caselotti (Snow White's voice in the movie). It was also featured in the 1979 stage adaptation of the 1937 animated musical movie. In AFI's 100 Years...100 Songs, it was ranked the 19th greatest film song of all time.

Production

Conception 
Adriana Caselotti was cast in the 1937 film Snow White and the Seven Dwarfs after interrupting a phone conversation her father – a voice coach – was having on the phone with a talent scout. The scout was casting the upcoming film and noted that a previous candidate had sounded like a 30-year-old, so was let go; Caselotti picked up the extension and recommended herself. Only 18 at the time, Disney thought she sounded like a 14-year-old, which is what he wanted, and he offered her the part. She worked on the film for a nominal fee for three years while the film was in production.

Composition 
Meanwhile, Frank Churchill was chosen as the film's composer, who was instructed by Walt Disney to write something "quaint" in order to "appeal more than the hot stuff". The song sees Caselotti perform with "piercing top notes" and "mushy vibrato". The chord structure that underpins the melody has an atypical quality, that led it to become popular within jazz circles. A long-time partner of Disney, after hearing that his work on Bambi was monotonous and uninteresting, he died at a piano from a gunshot wound in 1942. The song is typically played in the key of B-flat major.

Context 
This song first appears 57:40 into the movie, when Princess Snow White sings a bedtime song about how the prince she met at the castle will someday return for her. Later in the film, Snow White sings a reprise while making a pie and a more formal version with a chorus is heard when the prince and Snow White leave for his castle at the film's end.

Release

Aftermath 
After the film's release, the song became popular outside the context of the narrative as a jazz standard. The first performance was within the Theresienstadt concentration camp in 1943, played by a band known as the Ghetto Swingers. After World War II, it was performed by jazz musicians such as Dave Brubeck, who included it on his 1957 album Dave Digs Disney. Another popular recording came from Miles Davis in 1961, who named his album after the song.

Critical reception 
The Financial Times wrote that the song "spelt out the tantalising promise of love and nurture".

Legacy 
The American Film Institute listed this song at No. 19 on their list of the 100 greatest songs in movie history. Following "When You Wish Upon A Star" from Pinocchio at No. 7, this is the second-highest ranked song from a Disney movie out of four, with the other two being "Beauty and the Beast" from Beauty and the Beast at No. 62 and "Hakuna Matata" from The Lion King at No. 99. The song was then briefly sung on the 1971 sitcom All in the Family by Edith Bunker in the episode "Archie's Weighty Problem".

Selected covers

Jazz covers
 Dave Brubeck – Dave Digs Disney (1957)
 Bill Evans – Portrait in Jazz (1960)
 Miles Davis – Someday My Prince Will Come (1961)
 Wynton Kelly – Someday My Prince Will Come (1961)
 Oscar Peterson and Milt Jackson – Reunion Blues (1971)
 Herbie Hancock – The Piano (1978)
 Chick Corea - Akoustic Band (1989)
 Enrico Pieranunzi – Live in Paris (2001)
 Keith Jarrett - Up for It (2002)
 Stanley Clarke – Jazz in the Garden (2009)
Melody Gardot - Bye Bye Blackbird EP (2009)

Pop covers
 Barbra Streisand – Snow White and the Seven Dwarfs: Platinum Edition DVD/VHS (2001)
 Ayumi Hamasaki – (2002) Never for sale, the song was used by Disney in a promotional video for the re-release of Snow White and the Seven Dwarfs in Japan.
 Anastacia – Disneymania (2002)
 Ashley Tisdale and Drew Seeley – Disneymania 4 (2006)
 The Cheetah Girls – Disneymania 6 (2008)
 Tiffany Thornton - Snow White and the Seven Dwarfs: Diamond Edition DVD/Blu-ray (2009)
 Patricia Paay - Patricia Zingt (1966)
 Mireille Mathieu and Peter Alexander - Peter Alexander präsentiert Walt Disney's Welt (1976, in German)

See also
List of 1930s jazz standards

References

External links
  (on Disney's official channel)
 Music Copyright Infringement Resource - 1941 plagiarism case.

Songs about princes
1930s jazz standards
1937 songs
2002 singles
Jazz compositions in G major
Love themes
Music published by Bourne Co. Music Publishers
Pop ballads
Songs from Snow White and the Seven Dwarfs (1937 film)
Songs with lyrics by Larry Morey
Songs with music by Frank Churchill
Walt Disney Records singles